Brigadier Maharaja Sawai Bhawani Singh MVC (22 October 1931 – 17 April 2011) was an officer in the Indian Army and an entrepreneur.   

Singh served in the Indian army from 1951 to 1975.  In the Indo-Pakistani War of 1971, he was decorated with the Maha Vir Chakra, the country's second-highest award for gallantry in the face of the enemy. He later served as an advisor to the Indian forces in Sri Lanka.  After retirement, he served as India's High Commissioner to Brunei.  He oversaw the management of Rambagh Palace which had been converted into a hotel. 

Singh was the son of Man Singh II, the last ruling Maharaja of the princely state of Jaipur during the British Raj. Upon the death of his father on 24 June 1970, Bhawani Singh succeeded him in receiving an annual payment (the privy purse), certain privileges, and the use of the title "Maharaja of Jaipur" under terms accepted earlier when princely states were absorbed into independent India. However,  all were ended on December 28, 1971 by the 26th Amendment to the Constitution of India.

Bhawani Singh married Princess Padmini Devi of Sirmur in 1966.  Their only child, a daughter, Diya Kumari, is an Indian politician and a Member of Parliament.  Bhawani Singh died at age 79 of multi-organ failure.

Early life
Born to Maharaja Sir Sawai Man Singh II and his first wife, Marudhar Kanwar of Jodhpur, Bhawani Singh was educated at Sheshbagh School, Srinagar, The Doon School, Dehradun, and later Harrow School in the United Kingdom. As the first male heir born to a reigning maharaja of Jaipur for generations (all others, including his father, who was originally a minor noble, were adopted), his birth was a celebrated event in Jaipur. It is said that so much champagne flowed in celebration of his birth that the new heir was nicknamed "Bubbles".

Military career
Singh was commissioned into Indian Army in the 3rd Cavalry as a second Lieutenant holding a short-service commission in 1951 and was selected for the President's Bodyguards in 1954. On 31 July 1957, he received a regular commission as a lieutenant (seniority from 22 October 1954, and seniority as second lieutenant from 22 October 1952) with the service number IC-9015. Promoted to the ranl of captain on 22 October 1958, he served in the President's Bodyguard till 1963.

Singh was posted to 50th Parachute Brigade in 1963. Later, he was posted as Adjutant of the Indian Military Academy at Dehradun from January 1964 to 1967, during which time he was promoted to major on 22 October 1965.

In 1967, Singh was appointed second-in-command of the 10th battalion, The Parachute Regiment (Commando) (10 Para Cdo), one of the two elite Special Forces battalions. He was appointed the Commanding Officer (CO) in 1968.

Indo-Pakistani War of 1971
In 1970, Singh helped train the Mukti Bahini before the commencement of the Bangladesh Liberation War. During the war,  as an acting lieutenant-colonel, he commanded 10 Para Commando. The battalion, led by Singh, was responsible for the capture of Chachro in Sindh, for which he was decorated with the Maha Vir Chakra (MVC):

The citation for his MVC reads as follows:

Post-war career
Promoted to substantive lieutenant-colonel on 17 June 1973, Singh took early retirement from the army with effect from 23 May 1975. While the Indian Army was in action in Sri Lanka under Operation Pawan, the Prime Minister Rajiv Gandhi requested him to go to Sri Lanka and boost the low morale of his old unit (10 Para Cdo). He was successful in this venture and, for this, the President bestowed upon him the honorary rank of Brigadier on 29 November 1991. A promotion after retirement was considered a rare honour.

Diplomatic career
After his retirement from Indian Army, Singh served as High Commissioner of India to Brunei from 1994 to 1997.

Royal life
Bhawani Singh ascended the throne of Jaipur on 24 June 1970 following the death of his father, and held the title of Maharaja until the abolition of the princely order, his Privy Purse and other royal entitlements by Indira Gandhi in 1971, although he remained generally honoured like most other erstwhile rulers.

He married Princess Padmini Devi of Sirmur on 10 March 1966 in a ceremony held at Delhi. She was the daughter of his father's polo-playing friend HH Maharaja Rajendra Prakash of Sirmur by his wife Maharani Indira Devi. The couple had one daughter, Diya Kumari (b. 30 January 1971).

Having half-brothers but no son, in November 2002 he adopted his daughter's elder son, Padmanabh Singh, who succeeded him as head of the erstwhile royal family of Jaipur upon his death.

Other
In the same vein as his father, the first hotelier prince in India, Bhawani Singh ran many palaces as hotels, including the Rambagh Palace, Raj Mahal Palace, or other former royal residences. He was the first Indian prince to turn his Rambagh Palace in to luxury hotel in 1958. He conducted certain ceremonies and customs from the traditional seat of royal power, the sprawling City Palace, Jaipur, part of which remains under the control of his family.
He became one of the richest of India's maharajas of post-independent India.

Political career
He was also involved in local politics, as was his late stepmother, Gayatri Devi, his father's third wife. In 1975 he was arrested and imprisoned for a short period during The Emergency by Congress government at center, due to political vendetta along-with Gayatri Devi but was released after protests from various people including Indian Army and Lord Mountbatten, who spoke to Indira Gandhi.

Sawai Bhawani Singh contested the Lok Sabha elections in the year 1989 for the Indian National Congress Party but lost to the Bharatiya Janata Party leader Girdhari Lal Bhargava.

He then retired from active politics and devoted his time to his family and the protection and continuation of Jaipur's traditional arts and heritage.

Death
Bhawani Singh was admitted to a private hospital in Gurgaon, Haryana on 29 March and died on 17 April 2011 following multi-organ failure.

Ashok Gehlot, then Chief Minister of Rajasthan announced two days of state mourning. His body was flown to Jaipur and kept at the City Palace for people to pay their last respect before being cremated.

He was cremated on 18 April 2011 at Gaitore Ki Chhatriya, the royal crematorium in Jaipur with full state honours.

References

|-

1931 births
2011 deaths
Rajasthani politicians
Indian Army officers
Recipients of the Maha Vir Chakra
Indian amateur radio operators
People from Jaipur
Rajasthani people
Military personnel from Rajasthan
People educated at Harrow School
The Doon School alumni
Indian royalty
Indians imprisoned during the Emergency (India)
Indian National Congress politicians
High Commissioners of India to Brunei